Ernesto "Moe" Espinoza Vázquez (born May 11, 1999) is an American soccer player who plays as a winger for Chattanooga Red Wolves SC in USL League One.

Career
Espinoza played club soccer with local side Nomads SC, before moving to the academy team for Liga MX side Tijuana. Here he played at various youth levels, also appearing the team's third-division reserve team Tijuana Premier, making eight appearances and scoring a single goal. He left Tijuana in 2019.

Espinoza had a short spell with amateur side Chula Vista FC in the SoCal Premier League, before signing with NISA club San Diego 1904 ahead of their inaugural season. He went on to appear 22 times for San Diego over three seasons, scoring two goals and tallying four assists.

On March 31, 2022, Espinoza signed with USL League One club Chattanooga Red Wolves ahead of their 2022 season. He debuted for the Red Wolves on April 2, 2022, appearing as a 66th–minute substitute during a 1–1 draw with Forward Madison.

International
Espinoza had appeared at various youth levels, including U15, U18 and U19, for the United States men's national soccer team.

References

1999 births
Living people
American expatriate soccer players
American expatriate sportspeople in Mexico
American soccer players
American sportspeople of Mexican descent
Association football forwards
Chattanooga Red Wolves SC players
Club Tijuana footballers
Expatriate footballers in Mexico
Liga Premier de México players
National Independent Soccer Association players
Soccer players from California
Sportspeople from San Diego
United States men's youth international soccer players
USL League One players